Soundtrack is an American musical drama streaming television series created by Joshua Safran, that  premiered on Netflix on December 18, 2019. The series is executive produced by Safran alongside Megan Ellison and Ali Krug and stars Paul James, Callie Hernandez, Marianne Jean-Baptiste, Jenna Dewan, Jahmil French (in his final acting role), Megan Ferguson, Isaiah Givens, Madeleine Stowe, and Campbell Scott. In January 2020, the series was canceled after one season.

The series also featured one of the final acting roles of Markie Post as she died on August 7, 2021.

Premise
Soundtrack takes a look at "the love stories connecting a diverse, disparate group of people in contemporary Los Angeles through the music that lives inside their hearts and minds."

Cast and characters

Main

 Paul James as Samson "Sam" Hughes, a widower who works several jobs and has a son
 Callie Hernandez as Eleanor "Nellie" O’Brien, an aspiring artist
 Marianne Jean-Baptiste as Annette Sands, Sam's aunt who is a manager at a restaurant
 Jenna Dewan as Joanna Kassem, a former struggling dancer who is now a social worker
 Jahmil French as Dante Sands, Sam's cousin and Annette's eldest son who recently got out of prison and is a struggling to get a job as a convicted felon
 Megan Ferguson as Jean Dubrowski (assumed name is Gigi Dumont), Nellie's best friend
 Isaiah Givens as Barry Hughes, Sam and Nellie's six-year-old son who is having a hard time coping with his mother's death
 Madeleine Stowe as Margot Weston, Nellie's mother and Sam's mother-in-law
 Campbell Scott as Frank O’Brien, Nellie's father

Recurring

 Christina Milian as De'Andra, Dante's ex-girlfriend who is in medical school and married to a doctor
 Juliet G. James as Leah Sands, Annette's youngest daughter who is a high school student
 Robbie Fairchild as Troy, as Nellie and Gigi's friend
 Deron J. Powell as Arthur
 Sammy A. Publes as Mr. Hernandez
 Brian Keys as Carver
 Amy J. Carle as Stella, Joanna's colleague
 James McDaniel as Moses, Barry's soccer coach and Annette's love interest

Guest
 Leonard Wu as Stephen

Production

Development
On January 19, 2018, it was announced that Fox had given the production a pilot order. The pilot episode was written by Joshua Safran who was also set to executive produce alongside Megan Ellison and Sue Naegle. Ali Krug was set as a co-executive producer. Production companies involved with the pilot were expected to include Annapurna Television. On February 8, 2018, it was reported that Jesse Peretz would direct the pilot.

On May 11, 2018, Safran announced on Twitter that Fox had passed on the pilot and declined to order the production to series. Later that month, it was confirmed that the production was being shopped to other potential outlets. On July 2, 2018, it was announced that Netflix had given the production a straight-to-series order for a first season consisting of ten episodes. It was also reported that Ali Krug would now serve as an executive producer and that 20th Century Fox Television and Fox 21 Television Studios were now serving as additional production companies for the series. On January 31, 2020, it was announced that the series was canceled after one season.

Casting
In February 2018, it was announced that Madeleine Stowe and Callie Hernandez had joined the pilot's main cast. In March 2018, it was reported that Megan Ferguson, Jenna Dewan, Raúl Castillo had also joined the main cast of the pilot. Alongside the announcement of the series order in May 2018, it was reported that Castillo's role would be recast. On December 13, 2018, it was announced that Paul James had been cast to replace Castillo.

Episodes

Release
On December 3, 2019, the official trailer for the series was released by Netflix.
The series left Netflix on March 1, 2022 due to Disney pulling it from its platform in favor of it streaming on Disney+ or Hulu.

Reception
On Rotten Tomatoes, the series holds an approval rating of 38% with an average rating of 4.83/10, based on 8 reviews. On Metacritic, it has a weighted average score of 58 out of 100, based on 4 critics, indicating "mixed or average reviews".

References

External links

2010s American drama television series
2019 American television series debuts
2019 American television series endings
American musical television series
English-language Netflix original programming
Television series by 20th Century Fox Television
Television shows set in Los Angeles